Ellendale Township is a township in Dickey County, North Dakota, United States.

History
Ellendale Township is named for the wife of S. S. Merrill.

References

Populated places in Dickey County, North Dakota